Wada Bari Tarzan is a 2007 Sri Lankan Sinhala comedy film co-directed by Sudesh Wasantha Peiris and Sunil Soma Peiris and produced by Sunil T. Fernando for Sunil T. Films. It stars Tennyson Cooray, Jeevan Kumaratunga, Rex Kodippili, and Piyumi Purasinghe in lead roles along with Premadasa Vithanage, Chathura Perera and Jeevan Handunnetti. Music Composed by Keshan Perera. It is the 1085th Sri Lankan film in the Sinhala cinema. This film has brought debut cinema acting for Piyumi Purasinghe. It is inspired by Tarzan by Edgar Rice Burroughs

Plot

Cast
 Tennyson Cooray as Tarzan
 Piyumi Purasinghe as Maheshi
 Jeevan Kumaratunga as Professor Devaka
 Rex Kodippili as Treasure hunter
 Premadasa Vithanage as Gurunnanse 'Guruji'
 Chathura Perera as Perera
 Susila Kottage as Nimbula
 Jeevan Handunnetti as Nanna
 Sunil Hettiarachchi as Silva
 Manjula Thilini as Anjali
 Buddhika Rambukwella
 Ariyasena Gamage
 Dayaratne Siriwardena as Kiri Honda
 Rizwan Fa as Devaka's ally

Sequel

The directors made the sequel Wada Bari Tarzan Mathisabayata in 2008.

References

2007 films
2000s Sinhala-language films
2007 comedy films
Sri Lankan comedy films